CEF3 or CeF3 could signify:
 Bow Island Airport, an airport with the identifier code of CEF3
 Cerium(III) fluoride, a compound with the chemical formula of CeF3